Crashdïet (often stylised as CRASHDÏET) are a Swedish glam metal band formed in Stockholm in 2000. The group consists of Martin Sweet, Peter London, Eric Young and Gabriel Keyes. They have released six albums: 2005's Rest in Sleaze, 2007's The Unattractive Revolution, 2010s Generation Wild, 2013's The Savage Playground, 2019's Rust, and 2022's Automaton.

History

2000–2005: Formation and early years 

The band was originally formed in 2000 and built up a cult following with the release of their first demos, several of which were released on their official website via download. However, in late 2002, the band split up, with former members joining Repugnant and SubVision. Vocalist Dave Lepard then reformed the band with members from the current lineup, guitar player Martin Sweet and bassist Peter London were announced on the band's website on Christmas Day along with a call for drummers. In April 2003 Eric Young was announced as the band's new drummer. In 2003 Crashdiet released their first self-titled EP, and in 2004 they were signed to Universal Records.

2005–2006: Rest in Sleaze and Lepard's suicide 

In 2005, the band released their debut album, Rest in Sleaze, and they embarked on a Swedish tour in the fall of 2005 to support the album. The album did well overall (debuted at No. 12 on the Swedish album chart) although they were not especially famous outside of Sweden. The band also played at Download Festival in the United Kingdom in 2005, to support the album. The album debuted at No. 12 on the Swedish album chart and Four singles were produced from that album, including "Riot in Everyone", "Breakin' the Chainz", "Knokk 'Em Down" and "It's a Miracle".

On 20 January 2006, vocalist Dave Lepard committed suicide at the age of 25, after a bout of depression during which he hid from family and friends. After the death of Lepard, the band decided to end the band and said in an official statement that:

Several months later, on 2 April, they decided to start the band up again after getting support from the Lepard family and fans all over the world, they announced the following statement via their website:

2007–2008: New singer and The Unattractive Revolution 

On 22 January 2007 the band announced the addition of a new vocalist, H. Olliver Twisted from Finland (also playing in the band Reckless Love). They officially released their entire debut live performance (on the Rest in Sleaze Festival in February) with Olliver via their website as a free download. Later in the year, the band also announced plans for the album The Unattractive Revolution, and a single, "In the Raw". The album was released on 3 October 2007 and debuted at No. 11 on the Swedish album chart.

In November–December 2007 and February–April 2008, Crashdiet toured as opening act for Hardcore Superstar and on 23 February, the band announced via their official website that the second single from their new album would be "Falling Rain" On 13 July 2008 it was announced via the band's official website that H. Olliver Twisted  had come to an agreement with the band to go their separate ways. In 2009 the band announced their new lead singer, Simon Cruz and played their first show with him on the Sweden Rock Cruise in October.

2010–2017: Generation Wild and recent events 
On 14 April 2010, the band released Generation Wild, their first album with their new singer, Simon Cruz, and it debuted at No. 3 on the Swedish Album Chart. The title track was released as the first single on 28 February 2010, and its music video was banned by MTV due to obscene images. In September they were the opening act for Ozzy Osbourne in Globen, Sweden, and in October, the band played in front of 50,000 people at the SWU Festival in Brazil.

"Chemical", the second single from Generation Wild, was released on 19 September. On 24 March 2011, Crashdiet launched the European "Dark Decadence Tour" with Hardcore Superstar and the 69 Eyes that ended on  April. 16 Only a couple days later, they played a UK tour with Houston as co-headliners. On 4 June, the band announced on their website that they will film their Sweden Rock Festival show on 8 June for an upcoming DVD.

Generation Wild was released on vinyl on 2 November. This version also featured a bonus track called "Hollywood Teaze".

The band released their fourth album, The Savage Playground, on 22 January 2013. The first single, "Cocaine Cowboys", was released on 14 December 2012. 

Singer Simon Cruz left the band in the middle of their 2015 Japan tour. Gabriel Keyes was announced as the new lead singer in December 2017, with the single "We Are The Legion" to follow later that month. Another single, "Reptile",  was released on 1 January 2019.

2019–present: Rust and Automaton 
Crashdïet released their new full length studio record, Rust, with new singer, Gabriel Keyes, on 13 September 2019 via Frontiers music srl and also released the third single from the album, "In the Maze", on 5 August 2019.

In April 2022, the band announced their new album Automaton would be released later that month on 29 April. The band also announced that drummer Eric Young would be stepping down indefinitely from live duties in the band for an undetermined time period and is being replaced by Lacu for all upcoming tours booked in 2022.

Personnel 

Current members
 Martin Sweet – lead guitar, backing vocals (2002–2006, 2006–present); rhythm guitar (2006–2007, 2015–present)
 Peter London – bass, backing vocals (2002–2006, 2006–present)
 Eric Young – drums, backing vocals (2002–2006, 2006–present) (on hiatus since 2022)
 Gabriel Keyes – lead vocals (2017–present)

Current touring musicians
 Lacu – drums (2022–present)

Former members
 Dave Lepard – lead vocals, rhythm guitar (2000–2002, 2002–2006) (died 2006)
 Mary Goore – lead guitar (2000–2002)
 Mace Kelly – bass (2000–2002)
 Tom Bones – drums (2000–2002)
 H. Olliver Twisted – lead vocals (2007–2008)
 Simon Cruz – lead vocals, rhythm guitar (2009–2015)

Touring musician
 Michael Sweet – drums (2011)

Timeline

Discography 

 Rest in Sleaze (2005)
 The Unattractive Revolution (2007)
 Generation Wild (2010)
 The Savage Playground (2013)
 Rust (2019)
 Automaton (2022)

References

External links 

 
 
 Rock Hospital interview
 2008 Airbornmag.com interview

2000 establishments in Sweden
Swedish glam metal musical groups
Swedish heavy metal musical groups
Musical groups established in 2000
Musical groups from Stockholm